Timothy Mofolorunso Aluko (14 July 1918 – 1 May 2010) was a Nigerian writer.

Biography 
A Yoruba, Aluko was born in Ilesha in Nigeria and studied at Government College, Ibadan, and Higher College, Yaba in Lagos. He then studied civil engineering and town planning at the University of London. He held a number of administrative posts in his home country, including Director of Public Works in Western Nigeria. He departed from civil service in 1966 and from then until his retirement in 1978 he pursued a career as an academic, earning a doctorate in municipal engineering in 1976. He received several awards and honours including Officer of the Order of the British Empire (OBE) in 1963 and Officer Order of the Niger (OON) in 1964.

His novels, including One Man, One Wife (1959), One Man, One Matchet (1964), Kinsman and Foreman (1966), Chief the Honourable Minister (1970) and His Worshipful Majesty (1973), are satirical in tone, and deal with the clash of new and old values in a changing Africa.

In 1994, he published his autobiography, My Years of Service, an account of his activities as an engineer and university teacher. His later autobiographical book, The Story of My Life, published in 2007, provides a more in-depth look at Aluko's life, expounding on his childhood and his work as a civil servant.

T. M. Aluko died on 1 May 2010 in Lagos, aged 91.

References

External links 
 Review of Chief the Honourable Minister
 Encyclopædia Britannica's Biography of T.M. Aluko: Nigerian author

1918 births
2010 deaths
Alumni of the University of London
Nigerian male novelists
Officers of the Order of the British Empire
Officers of the Order of the Niger
Yoruba writers
People from Ilesha
Government College, Ibadan alumni
20th-century Nigerian novelists
English-language writers from Nigeria
20th-century male writers